Live Around the World is a live album by American jazz musician Miles Davis. The single CD contains live recordings from 1988 to 1991. The album peaked #4 in the Billboard Top Jazz Album chart.

Critical reception 

Writing for AllMusic, Scott Yanow said "no Miles Davis collection is complete without this important set." Down Beat magazine's Jon Andrews said his "once-controversial" pop covers benefited from "expansions and improvisations". Village Voice critic Robert Christgau was less enthusiastic, deeming it a "dud".

Track listing 

 "In A Silent Way" (Joe Zawinul) – 1:49
 "Intruder" (Miles Davis) – 4:52
 "New Blues" (Davis) – 5:35
 "Human Nature" (Porcaro, Bettis)  – 12:48
 "Mr. Pastorius" (Marcus Miller) – 3:32
 "Amandla" (Miller) –  5:52
 "Wrinkle" (Davis) – 7:17
 "Tutu" (Miller) – 8:53
 "Full Nelson" (Miller) – 2:48
 "Time After Time" (Rob Hyman, Cyndi Lauper) – 9:56
 "Hannibal" (Miller) – 7:22

Personnel 
Musicians
 Miles Davis – trumpet
 Foley – lead bass 
 Deron Johnson – keyboards on track (11)
 Benny Rietveld – bass on tracks (1-6,9,10)
 Richard Patterson – bass on tracks (7,8,11)
 Marilyn Mazur – percussion on tracks (1-4, 9)
 Erin Davis – electronic percussion (7,8)
 Ricky Wellman – drums
 Munyungo Jackson – percussion on tracks (5,6,10) 
 Rick Margitza – tenor sax on track (6)
 Kei Akagi – keyboards on tracks (5,6,7,8,10)
 John Beasley – keyboards on track (5)
 Joey DeFrancesco – keyboards on tracks (1,2,4)
 Kenny Garrett – alto saxophone on tracks (1-5,7,9,11), flute on tracks (8, 10)
 Adam Holzman – keyboards on tracks (1,2,3,4,6,9,10)
 Robert Irving III – keyboards on tracks (3,9)

Production
 Dan Gellert – analog transfer, editing
 Dany Gignoux – booklet, inlay design, photography
 Scott Hull – digital editing, mastering
 Don Kurek – engineer, mixing
 Gordon Meltzer – booklet design, CD art adaptation, compilation producer, cover photo, executive producer, liner notes
 Patrick Murray – engineer, mixing
 Stuart Nicholson – liner notes
 Tom Recchion – art direction, design
 Stine Schyberg – art direction, design
 Jeff Sedlik – photography

Chart performance

Certifications and sales

References

External links 

 

Miles Davis live albums
1996 live albums
Warner Records live albums